Sarel Daniel van der Merwe (born 5 December 1946) is a former rally and racing driver, who was a multiple South African Rally Drivers Champion. He is referred to by his nickname "Supervan".

Van der Merwe won the South African Rally Drivers Championship a record eleven times in 1975, from 1977 to 1985 and in 1988. Van der Merwe's IMSA career included time at Hendrick Motorsports during the Corvette GTP era, which also led to one NASCAR Sprint Cup start for the team, Watkins Glen in 1990 when Hendrick driver Darrell Waltrip was recuperating from a severe leg injury at the Firecracker 400 final practice, where he finished 24th; van der Merwe had attempted to qualify for the 1988 Daytona 500 in a Hendrick-owned car, but failed to make the race. He also held the SA Saloon Car Championship (1994), SA Modified Saloon Car Championship (1994 & 2001), and won the 1996 Castrol International Rally ending in Swaziland. He received his Springbok Colours in 1976 and his South African National Colours in 1997. In 2002, van der Merwe was awarded the Motorsport South African (MSA) Lifetime Achievement award.

Racing career
Van der Merwe began his racing career in 1967 racing saloon cars. His international career took off in 1983 in the IMSA series in the United States, with his most notable win in the 1984 24 Hours of Daytona race driving for Kreepy Krauly Racing, an all-South African team in a March 83G-Porsche. He shared the win with Graham Duxbury and Tony Martin. Van der Merwe did exceptionally well in the 1984 24 Hours of Le Mans where he finished 3rd on debut. In the 1986 Le Mans race, Sarel pulled in a lap early, and Jo Gartner took over. A lap later the suspension broke and the car veered off the Mulsanne Straight in the middle of the night and Gartner was killed.

His South African rallying days were extensive and colorful, and he displayed spectacular driving skills even under severe weather conditions. He started off with a private DKW around 1965, a motor car that had the reputation of being unbreakable, even so by Van. His father Sarel Senior had a long history racing DKWs (and Porsches), and had even won an award from the Auto Union mother company in Germany. Van der Merwe then moved up the ranks to sport a works-Ford Escort Mk II BDA (Belt Driven Assembly), the state-of-the-art machine around 1975−1979. The yellow car was jointly sponsored by the Ford Motor Company and Southern Suns hotel group, and later in the blue colours of Kreepy Krauly (South Africa). After leaving Ford because of a disagreement, Supervan had a short stint in the Datsun 160Y and Datsun Stanza, teamed up with U.K. rally ace Tony Pond around 1980. But van der Merwe always complained that his lanky body did not fit into the smaller Japanese cars. His final rally successes were in a factory team Audi Sport Quattro (1981−1986) with his rally swan song in the Volkswagen Golf front wheel drive hatchback in 1988. His co-driver/navigator was the ever-faithful Franz Boshoff, also a crowned Springbok, through all the years rallying with Ford, Datsun, Audi and Volkswagen.

He retired from competitive motor racing on 23 November 2002 after Round 12 of the Vodacom Power Tour at Kyalami, where he helped get the win for his team member Johan Fourie (Racing) whom he mentored, but he is still seen around some motorsport events, organising a few events and raising publicity for the sponsors of these events.

Other activities
Van der Merwe also worked as a correspondent for South African motor publications in the 1970s.

Motorsports career results

NASCAR
(key) (Bold – Pole position awarded by qualifying time. Italics – Pole position earned by points standings or practice time. * – Most laps led.)

Winston Cup Series

24 Hours of Le Mans results

References

External links

1946 births
Living people
Sportspeople from Port Elizabeth
South African rally drivers
South African racing drivers
24 Hours of Le Mans drivers
24 Hours of Daytona drivers
World Sportscar Championship drivers
24H Series drivers
Audi Sport drivers
Team Joest drivers
Porsche Motorsports drivers
Hendrick Motorsports drivers